Zaragoza, also called Saragossa in English, is a province of northern Spain, in the central part of the autonomous community of Aragon. 
Its capital is Zaragoza, which is also the capital of the autonomous community. Other towns in Zaragoza include Calatayud, Borja, La Almunia de Doña Godina, Ejea de los Caballeros and Tarazona.

Its area is [[1 E10 m2|17,274 km2]] and it is the fourth-largest Spanish province by land area. Its population was 954,811 in 2018, accounting for slightly over 72% of the entire population of Aragon; nearly 75% of those lived in the capital. Its population density was 51/km2. It contains 292 municipalities, of which more than half are villages with fewer than 300 people.

The main language throughout the province is Spanish (with official status), although Catalan is spoken in the Bajo Aragón-Caspe comarca and in Mequinenza municipality.

Geography
The province of Zaragoza is bordered by the provinces of Lleida, Tarragona, Teruel, Guadalajara, Soria, La Rioja, Navarre, and Huesca. The southern and western side of the province is in the mountainous Sistema Ibérico area and includes its highest point, the Moncayo, while the northern end reaches the Pre-Pyrenees. The Ebro River crosses the province from west to east.

Population
The historical population is given in the following chart:

Comarcas
Comarcas in the Zaragoza province:
 
The following comarcas having their capital in Huesca Province include municipal terms within Zaragoza Province:

 Bajo Cinca: Mequinenza.
 Hoya de Huesca: Murillo de Gállego and Santa Eulalia de Gállego.
 Jacetania: Artieda, Mianos, Salvatierra de Esca and Sigüés.
 Monegros: La Almolda, Bujaraloz, Farlete, Leciñena, Monegrillo and Perdiguera.

See also 
List of municipalities in Zaragoza

Notes and references

External links